The 2004 New Hampshire Democratic presidential primary was held on January 27, 2004. Taking place eight days after the Iowa caucuses, it marked the second contest to take place during the Democratic party's 2004 primary season, as well as the first actual primary to take place.

Polling
Primary polling taken by American Research Group during the last few days of campaigning (January 23 to January 27, 2004) showed that former New Hampshire poll leader as well as national leader Howard Dean was steadily gaining ground to catch up to now front-runner John Kerry. 

Gathered from ARG's 2004 NH Democratic Tracking Poll

Margin of Error +/- 4

Tracking polling showed that Dean had been catching up to Kerry in the days before the primary, cutting Kerry's 18 point lead to 10 points in a matter of days. With Dean dropping and Kerry rising, it became apparent that the battle for 1st place in New Hampshire would be close. Also, for third place, Wesley Clark, John Edwards and Joe Lieberman were the only ones fighting for third. With Clark and Edwards both taking hits going into the primary, a Lieberman on the rise, the fight for 1st place and third place, according to polls would be intense.

Results
As results began to come in during Primary night, it became apparent Kerry had won the primary and was promptly projected the winner by several media outlets. Dean finished in second place. Clark and Edwards were in a dead-lock for third place, with both candidates at 12% during the night. Earlier returns showed Lieberman in a stronger position to tie with Clark and Edwards, allowing him to declare to his supporters that it was "a three-way split decision for third place."

As final results were being tallied, Kerry won the primary with 84,277 votes and 38%, Dean finished second, with 57,761 and 26%, and Clark narrowly defeated Edwards for third place, with 27,314 votes and 12%. Lieberman had fallen back in the count and didn't even reach 10%.

Exit Polling

Source: CNN.com 2004 Primaries

Kerry won huge margins of support amongst almost all constituencies, with his only weak point amongst Republicans, who made up 4% of the voting block and was Lieberman's strongest point. Dean repeatedly came distant second or third for almost all categories of voters. Edwards defeated Clark amongst male voters as well as voters under 65, but only by a very tiny margin. Lieberman finished in a distant third in almost all categories except for Republicans, in which he nearly defeated John Kerry.

References

2004 New Hampshire elections
New Hampshire
2004